Siarhei Shundzikau (born 10 July 1981) is a Belarusian judoka.

Achievements

External links
 
 

1981 births
Living people
Belarusian male judoka
Judoka at the 2004 Summer Olympics
Olympic judoka of Belarus
20th-century Belarusian people
21st-century Belarusian people